Emmanuel Mate Kole  or Nene Sir Azzu Mate Kole I,  (1860 in Odumase – 1939) was the third Konor, or paramount chief, of the Manya Krobo from 1892 until his death in 1939. He was succeeded by his son, Nene Azzu Mate Kole II, who ruled Manya Krobo from 1939 until his death in 1990.

A former teacher in Basel Mission schools who trained at the Basel Mission Seminary, Akropong, he encouraged agricultural development and road-building as a ruler. In 1911, despite opposition from the Gold Coast Aborigines Rights Protection Society, he became the first African chief to be appointed to the Gold Coast Legislative Council.

References

1860 births
1939 deaths
19th-century rulers in Africa
20th-century rulers in Africa
Ga-Adangbe people
 Ghanaian Presbyterians
 Ghanaian Protestants
Ghanaian royalty
Presbyterian College of Education, Akropong alumni